Emad Atiya Ali El-Bahat (born 20 May 1970), is an Egyptian film director and screenwriter, also works as assistant for advertisements, documentaries and several shootings of foreign films in Egypt. Emad Elbahat's passion to cinema industry led him to meet three of the best and most important filmmakers in Egypt, Youssef Chahine, actually, Elbahat is the most influenced by, Daoud Abd El-Sayyed and Yousri Nasr Allah.

Film career 

In the early nineties, Elbahat grew interested in experimental cinema, he ruled as an assistant for Daoud Abd El-Sayyed and Yousri Nasr Allah, both directors were the real foundation of Elbahat's future film career. Later, Emad Elbahat was one of the few directors who had the luck to feel, breath and see cinema through the eyes of one of the most brilliant and well known movie makers in Egypt and worldwide, Youssef Chahine, so far considers as Elbahat's godfather, he was known as first assistant for Chahine's movies, Sokoot Hansawar (2001), Alexandria-New-York (2003).

In 2004 he began work on directing his first feature film, Hide and Seek, which was released in 2006. The script received a grant from the French Centre National de la Cinématographie (CNC) at the Carthage Film Festival in Tunisia and obtains excellent reviews in Cairo film festival and Dubai film festival at the same year (2006). In 2007, Elbahat finished shooting his second movie The Clown, he wrote and directed.

El-Belyatcho 2007 

Starring Haitham Ahmed Zaki, Ahmed salary, Fathi Abdel Wahab, Sawsan Badr, Heidi Karam, We have, Abdullah Musharraf. The film revolves under the teaser on a clown in a circus, who is facing a real crisis destroys his simple life, the film monitors through this character of "The Clown", issues of oppression and tyranny which are subjected to some ordinary people, exposing many social issues, and political interest to the Egyptian society. Screenplay Emad and Mohamed Al-Fekki, directed by Emad Elbhatt, produced by Al-Arabia Company for production and film distribution.

Ostoghomaia 2006 

Sharif and Leila are a couple who was rejected by society, parents and relatives because their Forbidden relationship had started before the marriage years, they meet their close friends to celebrate their marriage. Their friends, Yossef is a filmmaker who just returned from France After a scholarship lasted for 3 years, his ex-girlfriend Dr. Salma belongs to conservative family, she was raised in Saudi Arabia, Mustafa, strict journalist and Yahya, a former navy Captain, suggests to play a game, reincarnation, where each one of them impersonates another as he sees it, revealing aspects of his personality, whether it is negative or positive, they play till the night ends. starring Ahmad Yahya, Sarah Bassam, Heidi Karam, Nabil Issa, Amr Mamdouh, Assistant Director Amir Ramses

Filmography

References

External links 
 
 Emad Elbahat Official Page on Facebook
 elcinema.com

1970 births
Living people
Egyptian film directors
Egyptian screenwriters